Lin Xiangyang (born October 1964) is a general (shangjiang) of the People's Liberation Army (PLA) who is the current commander of Eastern Theater Command, in office since January 2022. Previously he served as commander of Central Theater Command from August 2021 to January 2022.

Biography
Born in the town of Haikou, Fuqing, Fujian, in October 1964, he graduated from PLA Army Infantry Academy. He was deputy commander of the 31st Group Army before serving as commander of the 47th Group Army in 2016. He was commander of the newly founded 82nd Group Army in March 2017, and held that office until April 2019, when he was appointed commander of the 72nd Group Army. He became commander of Eastern Theater Command Ground Force in April 2020, and served until August 2021. In August 2021, he rose to become commander of Central Theater Command, replacing Yi Xiaoguang. In January 2022, he was assigned as commander of Eastern Theater Command.

He was promoted to the rank of lieutenant general (zhongjiang) in July 2020 and general (shangjiang) in September 2021.

References

1964 births
Living people
People from Fuqing
People's Liberation Army generals from Fujian
Chinese Communist Party politicians from Jiangsu
Commanders of Central Theater Command